The 2012–13 World Series of Boxing was the third edition of the World Series of Boxing since its establishment in 2010 and runs from November 2012 to May 2013. The event was organized by the International Boxing Association (AIBA). The twelve teams, divided into two groups of six, contain a majority of boxers from the country in which they are based along with a smaller number of overseas boxers. The Team final bouts were hosted in Astana, Kazakhstan.

Competition format
Each team competes in home and fixtures against the others in their group. The top four teams from each group will qualify for the knock-out stages. The quarter and semi-finals will also take place on a home and away basis but the final will be held at a neutral venue over two days. Each fixture consists of five fights (five rounds of three minutes) at the following weights:

 Heavyweight (91+ kg)
 Light heavyweight (80 – 85 kg)
 Middleweight (68 – 73 kg)
 Lightweight (57 – 61 kg)
 Bantamweight (50 – 54 kg)

The points are attributed as follows:

 If the score is 5-0, 4-1, 4-0, 3-0, 3-1, 2-0 or 1-0: the winning team will get three points and the losing team will get zero points
 If score 3-2 or 2-1: the winning team will get three points and the losing team will get one point
 In the case of a draw each team will get two points

Champion Astana Arlans.

Group standings

Group A

Group B

Play-off round

Draft
A 118 fighters enters the International boxers draft with just 27 being picked by the teams.

References

World Series of Boxing
2012 in boxing
2013 in boxing
Boxing articles needing attention